Jozef Plachý (born 28 February 1949) is a former middle distance runner from Slovakia. He competed for Czechoslovakia at the 1968, 1972 and 1976 Summer Olympics in the 800 m and at the 1980 Olympics in the 1500 m event with the best result of fifth place in 1968. In 1969–1974 Plachý won four medals at European championships, indoors and outdoors. On 27 June 1973 he "helped" Marcello Fiasconaro, by chasing him through the race, to set an 800 m world record in Milan.

References

External links 
 
 
 
 
 

1949 births
Living people
Slovak male middle-distance runners
Czechoslovak male middle-distance runners
Olympic athletes of Czechoslovakia
Athletes (track and field) at the 1968 Summer Olympics
Athletes (track and field) at the 1972 Summer Olympics
Athletes (track and field) at the 1976 Summer Olympics
Athletes (track and field) at the 1980 Summer Olympics
Sportspeople from Košice
European Athletics Championships medalists
Universiade medalists in athletics (track and field)
Universiade gold medalists for Czechoslovakia
Medalists at the 1977 Summer Universiade